Shock, Horror, Aunty! was an Australian comedy television series that aired on ABC1 on 9 February 2013 until 27 December 2013.  It was hosted by Craig Reucassel.

References 

Australian Broadcasting Corporation original programming
Australian comedy television series
2013 Australian television series debuts
2013 Australian television series endings